Gobernador Piñero is one of the 18 barrios of the municipality of San Juan, Puerto Rico.

This district is named after Jesús T. Piñero who was the first and only native Puerto Rican governor of the territory under the American colonial administration in 1946.

Demographics

Gobernador Piñero is San Juan’s second most populated barrio after Santurce. It has a population density of 10,770.4 residents per square mile (4,158.47/km2).

Geography 
Gobernador Piñero is bounded to the north by the San Juan Bay and Port and Hato Rey Norte barrio, with the barrios of Hato Rey Sur and El Cinco to the east, by Monacillo Urbano to the south, and by the municipality of Guaynabo to the west.

Gobernador Piñero includes the areas of Puerto Nuevo (including Puerto Nuevo Norte), Villa Borinquen, Bosque Urbano de San Patricio, Caparra Terrace and Centro Médico.

Landmarks and places of interest 

 Luis Muñoz Marín Park, one of the main city parks of San Juan.
 Port of San Juan, partially located in the barrio at Puerto Nuevo.
 San Juan Medical Center or Centro Médico de Rio Piedras.
 San Patricio State Forest, also known as the San Patricio Urban Forest, one of the 20 state forests of Puerto Rico.
 University of Puerto Rico, Medical Sciences Campus.

Transportation 
The area is served by the Martínez Nadal (bordering with the municipality of Guaynabo), Las Lomas, San Francisco and Centro Médico metro stations.

Gallery

See also

 List of communities in Puerto Rico

References

Río Piedras, Puerto Rico
Barrios of San Juan, Puerto Rico